Sir Donald George Anderson  (1 March 191730 November 1975) was a senior Australian public servant. He was Director-General of the Department of Civil Aviation from January 1956 until September 1973.

Life and career
Anderson was born to parents Clara Catherine Anderson (née Nash) and Alex Gibb Anderson in Waikerie, South Australia on 1 March 1917. He was schooled at Adelaide High School and the University of Adelaide.

On 1 January 1956, Anderson began his term as Director-General of the Department of Civil Aviation. He served in the role until September 1973, in retirement serving as Chairman of Qantas.

Anderson died on 30 November 1975 in Heidelberg, Melbourne.

Awards
In June 1950 Anderson was appointed a Commander of the Order of the British Empire for his service as Director-General in the Department of Civil Aviation. He was made a Knight Bachelor in June 1967.

References

1917 births
1975 deaths
Australian public servants
Australian Commanders of the Order of the British Empire
Australian Knights Bachelor
University of Adelaide alumni
People educated at Adelaide High School